The Treason (Ireland) Act 1854 (17 & 18 Vict. c. 26) is an Act of the Parliament of the United Kingdom of Great Britain and Ireland. It extended part of the Treason Act 1708 to Ireland, specifically the rules about giving the defendant advance notice of the witnesses and jurors in his case. It was repealed as regards Northern Ireland by the Treason Act 1945, which abolished the unique procedural rules which applied in treason cases.  it remains in force in the Republic of Ireland.

The rule in the 1708 Act which was extended to Ireland was as follows:
"...[W]hen any person is indicted for high treason or misprision of treason, a list of the witnesses that shall be produced on the trial, for proving the said indictment, and of the jury, mentioning the name, professions, and place of abode of the said witnesses and jurors, be also given at the same time that the copy of the indictment is delivered to the party indicted; and that copies of all indictments for the offences aforesaid, with such lists, shall be delivered to the party indicted, ten days before the trial, and in presence of two or more credible witnesses; any law or statute to the contrary notwithstanding."

References

Sources
A Collection of the Public General Statutes passed in the seventeenth and eighteenth year of the reign of Her Majesty Queen Victoria (1854) London: Eyre & Spottiswoode, page 220.

Citations

See also
Poynings' Law (confirmation of English statutes)
Treason Act (Ireland) 1765
Treason (Ireland) Act 1821
Treason Act 1939
Treason Act

1854 in British law
United Kingdom Acts of Parliament 1854
Irish criminal law
Treason in Ireland
Treason in the United Kingdom